The Mistmantle Chronicles, by M. I. McAllister, is a series of children's novels about anthropomorphic animals. It features the life of a pale, honey-coloured Eurasian red squirrel named Urchin. The first book in the Mistmantle Chronicles, Urchin of the Riding Stars was published by Bloomsbury Publishing in 2005.

Urchin of the Riding Stars (2005)
A very pale squirrel named Urchin is born on the day of the riding stars. His prophecy is that he will take down a great leader. His mother died when he was born. He is fostered by Apple, a loud and talkative loving mother. Queen Spindle and King Brushen are threatened when their son is murdered, intriguing their court. A wicked pair in disguise attempt to seize control of the island, introducing a regime of culling and forced labour. An innocent animal is intentionally falsely accused. Urchin will have to take down Captain Husk and Lady Aspen to save the island. Urchin soon realises that he will have a very special role to play in the dramatic battle to save Mistmantle and Captain Crispin.

Urchin and the Heartstone (2006)
The animals of Mistmantle prepare for the coronation of Crispin the squirrel. But when the Heartstone goes missing and Urchin gets kidnapped by some unexpected visitors from the island called Whitewings, panic begins to rise. Urchin knows he must escape the island before it's too late. Crispin does his part and many lives are risked to save Urchin. Along the way, Urchin gains a new friend and also discovers a secret about his past that will change his life forever.

The Heir of Mistmantle (2007)
When the heir of Mistmantle, Princess Catkin, is kidnapped, every corner of the island is searched. A mysterious epidemic begins to ravage the island, and news starts spreading about sightings of the infamous Captain Husk, who everyone believed was dead. The inhabitants of Mistmantle begin to worry that these events are connected and that Husk's reign of evil is about to return. Can Urchin and his trusty friend Juniper recover Catkin before her life is in serious danger?

Urchin and the Raven War (2008)
Life is peaceful on Mistmantle until it is interrupted when Lord Arcneck returns to the island, asking for help in a war against bloodthirsty ravens. King Crispin and his friends proceed to aid the Swan Lord, but they soon bring the wrath of the ravens down upon Mistmantle.

When vengeful ravens attack Mistmantle Island, King Crispin, Urchin, and the islanders are faced with some of the most terrifying challenges their island has ever known. Will the animals of Mistmantle band together to defeat this evil enemy? And could it be true that there is a voyager on the island who is able to travel beyond the mists and back again?

Urchin and the Rage Tide (2010)
Under the wise guidance of King Crispin, the animals of Mistmantle have enjoyed a long period of peace and prosperity since the Raven War. However, the tranquility is disrupted when a series of tidal waves threatens to destroy the island. Mossberry, an influential squirrel with delusions of grandeur, sees the impending disaster as an opportunity to rise to power. Urchin, his page Corr, and King Crispin's Circle must stop Mossberry and bring the islanders to safety. When a beloved citizen is swept away in the rage tide, the ultimate sacrifice must be made.

Islands

Mistmantle

Mistmantle is the island where all the Mistmantle Chronicles are mainly set. It is a relatively small island with mists that surround it which keep those who would seek to harm Mistmantle off the island and keep those who do not belong on the island away. Only a Voyager has been known to leave Mistmantle and return more than three times. In the books, Mistmantle plays host to two battles and one minor fight in book one and a more full-scale war in the fourth book, Urchin and the Raven War. Mistmantle has its own tower where the king, queen and captains live which has sandstone-yellow walls and comes under attack in books 1,2 and 4.
To the south on Mistmantle is Anemone Wood where Urchin and Needle were brought up and there is a good-sized jetty by the tower.

Swan Isle

About one-third into the first book, Crispin is seen making his way across the ocean from his home. His lone voyage takes him to two other islands in the same chain as Mistmantle. One was no more than a barren piece of stone thrusting up from the sea while the other was dominated by giant crabs and other crustaceans, which he battled to escape. Eventually, he reaches an island far from Mistmantle, which is later identified as Swan Isle. It is where he meets Lord and Lady Arcneck, rulers of the island, and Whisper, a female red squirrel who later becomes the love of his life. It is also where Urchin arrives, unaware that he has brought with him a mole who kills Whisper, seeking to recover Crispin and bring him back to Mistmantle.

Whitewings

Whitewings is a large island (compared to Mistmantle) about three days away from Mistmantle by boat. We first hear of the island in Urchin and the Heartstone when Urchin is taken there to satisfy the mad King Silverbirch's desire for silver. It has a large stone fortress that is a little way from the beach where the boat Urchin was brought in was moored, the fortress is destroyed in an earthquake at the end of the book. Further into the island there are several large hills which are pointed out to Urchin, one being Eagle Crag from which Urchin's father Candle was presumably pushed off and killed. There are silver mines which Silverbirch makes his animals work in so the island is covered in a slight layer of dust and many animals have lung and breathing problems from being forced to work in the silver mines. Under the fortress are a series of tunnels and caves that are used by the Larchlings for meetings and a place of refuge for those who are in danger of being assassinated by Silverbirch's soldiers.

Ashfire

Ashfire is the island where Cedar and Almond originally come from. It is home to an active volcano or "fire mountain" as it is referred to in the books, and is known to have water poisonous to non-native creatures. Cedar and Almond left the island when they were young as the volcano erupted. Ashfire is mentioned in books two and five. Sepia lands there in her boat in the middle of Urchin and the Rage Tide.

Characters

Urchin
Urchin is a young, energetic and charismatic red squirrel who looks different from most. His fur is the colour of honey; only the tips of his ears and tail are the colour that identifies his species. He was born on a night of riding stars on the shore opposite to where Mistmantle Tower is located. His mother lived just long enough to give him a blessing. He was rescued by Crispin, who was then a skittish page, and Apple, who took him and raised him as her adopted son. Several years later he was approached by Crispin, who had since become a captain, and when Urchin is asked to be his page he accepts enthusiastically. Urchin performs many heroic deeds throughout his life, such as bringing back Crispin and helping to redeem the island of Whitewings. He becomes companion to the king in book one, redeems Whitewings and learns of his parents Almond and Candle in book two, becomes a circle member in book three and is a captain by the end of book five. At the end of book five, he proposes to Sepia, and she accepts

Crispin

Crispin is a red squirrel who is a Captain of Mistmantle. He found Urchin on the shore when he was a new Captain. In the first book Crispin was exiled after being falsely accused of murder and ends up on Swan Isle, where he meets—and later marries—a lovely red squirrel called Whisper. She is later murdered by Gloss the mole. Crispin journeys back to Mistmantle with Urchin on the back of swans and helps to save Mistmantle from Husk. At the end of book one Crispin is proclaimed to be King by the laws of Mistmantle Island after King Brushen dies towards the end of book one. In book two he refuses to be crowned and does all he can until Urchin is returned to the island. He falls in love with Cedar, and in book three they have their first child and heir of Mistmantle, Catkin. He is also the father of Oakleaf and Almondflower. He fights and is gravely injured in book four during the Raven war and dies at the end of the fifth book.

Husk
Husk is an ambitious squirrel who seeks to take over the island in the first book by making the king's decisions for him. He becomes extremely evil when he discovers an old pit beneath Mistmantle Tower where the kings of old made sacrifices. He murders many babies that have problems physically with the help of his girlfriend and later wife, Lady Aspen. After his plots are revealed by Captain Padra, he is pursued and dies falling into the pit. His body isn't discovered until book three, when Juniper goes looking for him to disprove rumours that Husk is alive and because of his mixed feelings about Husk being his father.

Padra

Padra is an otter who has a face which looks as if he is always about to laugh, and he is Crispin's best friend. He, Husk, and Crispin are all captains in book one. Padra is very angry when Crispin is exiled from Mistmantle, and takes Urchin on as a page after Crispin enters the Mists. Padra has a long-term girlfriend called Arran, and they get married at the end of book one. In book two they have twins, Tide and Swanfeather (Tide is a boy and Swanfeather is a girl). He is the older brother of Fingal. In book five they have another baby girl otter whom they name Fionn.

Arran

Arran is Padra's longtime girlfriend and later wife. She is made a Captain of Mistmantle at the end of book one and resigns in book five as she wishes to spend more time with her young daughter, Fionn.

Lugg

Lugg is a down to earth brave and determined mole who is a member of the Circle and a captain. In book one Lugg aids Urchin in his adventures and fights valiantly alongside Padra in the battle against Husk. Crispin makes him a captain after he is named king. In the third book, Lugg died after he tried to stop Linty from taking Catkin away from the island; his heart gave out. Fingal the otter named his boat after Lugg.

Brother Fir

Brother Fir is Mistmantle's priest in books one to four. He is said to have kind, wise eyes and a depth of great joy that no one else has. He dies peacefully in book four, and was said to be ancient. Juniper followed him by becoming the next priest.

Sepia

Sepia is a kind, caring squirrel with the sweetest voice on the island, and is the leader of the Choir. She is introduced in book one, at the Spring Festival, and becomes a main character throughout the other books. She rescues Princess Catkin in book three, because she was the only one calm and kind enough to get past Mistress Linty, Catkin's captor. She and Urchin also have a developing relationship throughout the series, with Urchin proposing to her-which she accepts-at the end of book five.

Juniper

Juniper the squirrel is Urchin's trusty friend (they consider each other brothers) that helps him throughout his journeys. He is later found as having prophetic powers and limps due to a twisted paw. In book three, he finds out who his father was when his foster mother Damson the squirrel was on her deathbed in book three, making him feel horrible and afraid he will turn out like his father, Husk. He becomes the islands priest when Brother Fir dies in book four.

Needle

Needle the hedgehog is Urchin's steadfast friend who sticks with him throughout all his adventures. She is a little sharper than most hedgehogs. Needle is a seamstress in the castle and is made part of the Circle with Urchin in book three. Urchin and Lugg rescued Needle's younger brother Scufflen from Husk, who sentenced him to be culled in book one.

Cedar

Cedar is a squirrel from the island of Whitewings. She first comes into the stories in Urchin and the Heartstone, where she is undercover in King Silverbirch's court. She plays a significant role in helping Urchin escape from King Silverbirch, as well as rebelling against Silverbirch. At the end of the book, Cedar goes to Mistmantle and marries King Crispin. In the remaining books, The Heir of Mistmantle especially, she is the queen of Mistmantle and useful as a healer.

References

External links
Margaret McAllister

Fantasy novel series
Series of children's books
British children's novels
Bloomsbury Publishing books
Children's novels about animals
Fictional squirrels